Flying Tiger Line Flight 66 was a scheduled international cargo flight from Singapore Changi Airport, to Hong Kong's Kai Tak Airport via a stopover at Kuala Lumpur International Airport, Malaysia. On February 19, 1989, the FedEx-owned Boeing 747-249F-SCD crashed while on its final approach.

Aircraft and crew
The aircraft, registered as N807FT, made its first flight on 1 November 1979 before being delivered new to Flying Tiger Line on 11 December 1979. Its manufacturer serial number was 21828 and its construction number was 408. At the time of the accident, it had flown over 9,000 flight cycles and 34,000 airframe hours.

The crew consisted of Captain Francis "Frank" Halpin (53); First Officer John "Jack" Robinson (54); and Flight Engineer Ronald Penton (70). Leonard Sulewski (53), an aircraft mechanic, was also on board.

Accident
The aircraft was assigned a non-directional beacon (NDB) approach to Runway 33 at Sultan Abdul Aziz Shah Airport, Kuala Lumpur, after having flown 30 minutes from Singapore Changi Airport.  In descent, the flight was cleared to "Kayell" with a morse code of "KL" of which four separate points on the ground were commonly called by Malaysian ATC albeit with different frequencies.  Two separate radio beacons were identically coded "KL" as well as the VOR abbreviation (Kuala Lumpur shortened to "KL") and the airport was also sometimes referred to as "KL" by local ATC (instead of the full "Kuala Lumpur").  The crew was unsure to which point they were cleared, and the cockpit voice recorder revealed that the crew argued about which radios should be set to which frequencies and which approach was actually going to be conducted. (Even in the last few moments of the flight, the captain referenced the ILS approach for runway 33 which was named as inop on the flight release and the ATIS, additionally the crew was told by ATC that the ILS approach was not available.)

ATC radioed to the flight, "Tiger 66, descend two four zero zero (about ), cleared for NDB approach runway 33." The Cockpit voice recorder  also revealed several communication errors made by the flight crew prior to this miscommunication and a general casual nature of the Captain, who was the pilot-not-flying on this particular leg of the trip.

The subsequent fire burned for two days.

Causes

The First Officer had complained that he did not have an approach plate in front of him and had not seen the approach. From a pilot's perspective, this alone would be considered the cause of the crash because the approach plate (chart) provides the pilot with the courses and minimum altitudes necessary to execute the approach without impacting terrain. Flying an approach without referring to the approach plate is gross negligence.

Additionally, the First Officer (FO), who was the pilot flying at the time, expressed concern about conducting the NDB approach and indicated a preference for the ILS for runway 15. However, the FO was not assertive and no further action was taken. The Captain dismissed his concern saying he was familiar with the airport and the approaches.

A contributing factor to this accident was the non-ICAO phraseology used by Kuala Lumpur air traffic control and the Captain of the aircraft. This breakdown of communication contributed to the crew misinterpreting the instructions given. However, this particular controlled-flight-into-terrain accident ultimately resulted from a crew failure to adhere to the instrument approach procedure, poor crew resource management and poor situational awareness.

Procedure changes
The incident further stressed the need for increased awareness and training of crew resource management techniques and standard operating procedures. This accident is used as an example of 'what not to do' by flight training organizations such as FlightSafety International. The FAA video production using the original CVR recording and transcript is still used to study the events and how to improve current techniques. Much of this information is derived from that video.

See also

List of aviation accidents and incidents involving CFIT
Korean Air Flight 801

References

 Aviation Week & Space Technology 27.02.89 (24)
 Flight Int. 17-12.01.1990 (p. 44)
 ICAO Adrep Summary

1989 in Malaysia
Airliner accidents and incidents involving controlled flight into terrain
Airliner accidents and incidents caused by pilot error
Aviation accidents and incidents caused by air traffic controller error
Aviation accidents and incidents in 1989
Aviation accidents and incidents in Malaysia
Flying Tiger Line accidents and incidents
Accidents and incidents involving the Boeing 747
February 1989 events in Asia